Potamochoerini is a tribe of even-toed ungulates which encompasses the giant forest hogs and the river pigs.

References

Suinae
Miocene even-toed ungulates
Extant Miocene first appearances
Mammal tribes